The "Ballade des dames du temps jadis" ("Ballade of Ladies of Time Gone By") is a poem by François Villon that celebrates famous women in history and mythology, and a prominent example of the ubi sunt? genre.  It is written in the fixed-form ballade format, and forms part of his collection Le Testament in which it is followed by the Ballade des seigneurs du temps jadis.

The section is simply labelled Ballade by Villon; the title des dames du temps jadis was added by Clément Marot in his 1533 edition of Villon's poems.

Translations and adaptations
Particularly famous is its interrogative refrain, Mais où sont les neiges d'antan?, an example of the  motif, which was common in medieval poetry and particularly in Villon's ballads.

This was translated into English by Rossetti as "Where are the snows of yesteryear?", for which he popularized the word yester-year to translate Villon's antan.  The French word was used in its original sense of "last year", although both antan and the English yesteryear have now taken on a wider meaning of "years gone by".  The phrase has also been translated as "But where are last year's snows?".

The ballade has been made into a song (using the original Middle French text) by French songwriter Georges Brassens, and by the Czech composer Petr Eben, in the cycle Šestero piesní milostných (1951).

Text of the ballade, with literal translation

The text is from Clement Marot's Œuvres complètes de François Villon of 1533, in the Le Grand Testament pages 34 to 35.

In popular culture
The refrain Mais où sont les neiges d'antan? has been quoted or alluded to in numerous works.

 In Bertolt Brecht's 1936 play Die Rundköpfe und die Spitzköpfe (Round Heads and Pointed Heads), the line is quoted as "Wo sind die Tränen von gestern abend? / Wo is die Schnee vom vergangenen Jahr?" ("Where are the tears of yester evening? / Where are the snows of yesteryear?") in "Lied eines Freudenmädchens" (Nannas Lied) ("Song of a joy-maiden [prostitute]" (Nanna's song)); music originally by Hanns Eisler, alternative arrangement by Kurt Weill.

 The original 1945 manuscript of the play, “The Glass Menagerie” by Tennessee Williams, contains optional stage directions for projecting the legend “Où sont les neiges d’antan?” on a screen during Amanda’s monologue in Scene One where she recounts her (likely exaggerated)past life as a popular Southern Belle

 The poem was alluded to in Joseph Heller's novel Catch-22, when Yossarian asks "Where are the Snowdens of yesteryear?" in both French and English, Snowden being the name of a character who dies despite the efforts of Yossarian to save him.

 Umberto Eco quotes the line "Where are the snows of yesteryear?" in the final chapter "Last Page" of The Name of the Rose.

James O'Barr wrote "Oú sont les neiges d'antan Villon" in his 1981 graphic novel The Crow" under an image of The Crow lying broken hearted and empty. 

 In S2:E9 of Downton Abbey, the Dowager Countess of Grantham, played by Dame Maggie Smith, quotes the refrain "Mais où sont les neiges d'antan?" in its original French, when referring to the father of the present Lord "Jinks" Hepworth, who she knew in the 1860s.

See also

 Le Testament
 François Villon
 Ballade des pendus

References

15th-century poems
French poems
Poetry by François Villon
French-language poems